Enteromius erythrozonus is a species of cyprinid fish endemic to the Republic of the Congo where it is only known from the Foulakari River.  This species reaches a length of  TL. Aside from being hunted for human consumption, nothing else is known about the species.

References

External links 
 Photograph

Endemic fauna of the Republic of the Congo
Enteromius
Fish described in 1959
Taxa named by Max Poll
Taxa named by Jacques G. Lambert